"The Lady Lies" is the tenth track on the Genesis 1978 album …And Then There Were Three…, with music and lyrics written by Tony Banks. The lyrics tell the story of a man who rescues a woman from the mouth of a monster, but is later seduced by the woman, or as the band refer to her during the song, a demon, and led into an unknown fate. The song was performed often during the 1978 and 1980 tours.  In the live shows, Phil would often coach the audience on when to cheer and when to boo in response to different characters in the song and their actions. The final instrumental part would be extended by Daryl Stuermer's guitar solo.

Personnel 
Tony Banks – Hammond Tonewheel T-102 organ -> MXR Phase 100 -> Boss CE-1 Stereo Chorus, Yamaha CP-70 electric grand piano, Mellotron, ARP 2600 -> Roland RE-201 space echo, Moog Polymoog (polyphonic analogue synthesizer) -> MXR Distortion+ and MXR Phase 100 (solo section), backing vocals
Phil Collins – drums, lead vocals, percussion, backing vocals
Mike Rutherford – bass, guitar, backing vocals

Footnotes

1978 songs
Genesis (band) songs
Songs written by Tony Banks (musician)